Belorechensky District is an administrative district (raion), one of the thirty-eight in Krasnodar Krai, Russia. As a municipal division, it is incorporated as Belorechensky Municipal District. It is located in the southern central part of the krai, but is bordered for the main part by the Republic of Adygea. Its administrative center is the town of Belorechensk (which is not administratively a part of the district). Population:

Administrative and municipal status
Within the framework of administrative divisions, Belorechensky District is one of the thirty-eight in the krai. The town of Belorechensk serves as its administrative center, despite being incorporated separately as an administrative unit with the status equal to that of the districts (and which, in addition to Belorechensk, also includes three rural localities).

As a municipal division, the district is incorporated as Belorechensky Municipal District, with the Town of Belorechensk being incorporated within it as Belorechenskoye Urban Settlement.

References

Notes

Sources



Districts of Krasnodar Krai